is a Japanese football player.

Club statistics
Updated to 23 February 2020.

References

External links

Profile at AC Nagano Parceiro

1990 births
Living people
Kyoto Sangyo University alumni
Association football people from Shiga Prefecture
Japanese footballers
J3 League players
Japan Football League players
AC Nagano Parceiro players
MIO Biwako Shiga players
Association football defenders